This & That is a 2015 children's picture book by Mem Fox and illustrated by Judy Horacek. It is about a mouse telling bedtime stories to a pup.

Publication history
 2017, USA, Scholastic Press 
 2015, Australia, Scholastic Australia

Reception
A reviewer in Reading Time wrote "Mem Fox's rhymed rhythmic text teams brilliantly with Judy’s bright quirky cartoon illustrations", and Publishers Weekly wrote "for times when a single bedtime story just isn't enough, ...".

There have been further reviews by Kirkus Reviews, School Library Journal. Reading Time, and Children's Book and Media Review.

It is a 2016 CBCA Book of the Year: Early Childhood notable book.

References

External links

 Library holdings of This & That

Australian picture books
2015 children's books
Picture books by Mem Fox